Arthur Cyprian Harper (1866–1948) was the 26th Mayor of Los Angeles, California, from December 13, 1906, to March 11, 1909.  He was forced to resign in the wake of a recall drive due to dishonesty that marked his administration. While mayor, he began work on the Los Angeles Civic Center.

Biography
A native of Columbus, Mississippi, he died in Palmdale, California, on December 25, 1948.

He was buried at Angelus-Rosedale Cemetery in Central Los Angeles.

References

Mayors of Los Angeles
1866 births
1948 deaths
Burials at Angelus-Rosedale Cemetery
People from Columbus, Mississippi